Four ships and a training establishment of the Royal Navy have borne the name HMS Tenedos, after the island of Tenedos:

Ships
  was a 38-gun fifth rate launched in 1812. She was used as a convict hulk from 1843 and was broken up in 1875.
  was a wooden  screw sloop launched in 1870. She was rated as a corvette from 1875 and was sold in 1887.
   was a depot ship for torpedo boat destroyers at Devonport. She was the former , renamed HMS Tenedos in 1904. She was transferred to Chatham Dockyard in 1906 to become a training establishment.
  was an  launched in 1918 and sunk in 1942.

Training establishments
  was a training establishment at Chatham for boy artificers. It was established in 1906 aboard the old HMS Triumph, but closed in 1910. A number of other ships were renamed HMS Tenedos whilst serving as homes for the establishment:
  was the original HMS Tenedos between 1906 and 1910.
  was HMS Tenedos II between 1905 and 1910.
  was HMS Tenedos III between 1906 and 1910.

See also
 Tenedos (disambiguation)

Royal Navy ship names